The Galaksija (meaning "Galaxy") was a build-it-yourself computer designed by Voja Antonić. It was featured in the special edition Računari u vašoj kući (Computers in your home, written by Dejan Ristanović) of a popular eponymous science magazine, published late December 1983 in Belgrade, Yugoslavia. Kits were available but not required as it could be built entirely out of standard off-the-shelf parts. It was later also available in complete form.

History 
In the early eighties, restrictions in SFR Yugoslavia prevented importing computers into the country. At the same time, even the cheapest computers available in the West were nearing average monthly salaries. This meant that only a relative minority of people owned one – mostly a ZX Spectrum or a Commodore 64, though most Yugoslavs were only familiar with a programmable calculator.

According to his own words, some time in 1983, Voja Antonić, while vacationing in Hotel Teuta in Risan, was reading the application handbook for the RCA CDP1802 CPU and stumbled upon CPU-assisted video generation. Since the CDP1802 was very primitive, he decided that a Zilog Z80 processor could perform the task as well.

Before he returned home to Belgrade, he already had the conceptual diagrams of a computer that used software to generate a video picture. Although using software as opposed to hardware would significantly reduce his design's performance, it also simplified the hardware and reduced its cost.

His next step was to find a magazine to publish the diagrams in. The obvious choice was SAM Magazine published in Zagreb, but due to prior bad experiences he decided to publish elsewhere. Near the same time that Antonić made his discovery, Dejan Ristanović, a computer programmer and journalist was entrusted with preparing a special edition of the Galaksija magazine that would be focused on home computers. After Ristanović and Antonić met, they decided to collaborate and publish the computer's diagram in a special issue of the magazine entitled Računari u vašoj kući (Computers in your home). It was released late December 1983. The name of the magazine (Galaksija) would become twinned with the name of the computer.

Antonić and Ristanović guesstimated that around a thousand people would try to build the computer by themselves, given that the magazine's circulation was 30,000. Some 8,000 people wound up ordering the build-it-yourself kits from Antonić. This number may in reality be greater if people who did not purchase any kits (including PCB and ROMs) were accounted for.

Components were provided by various manufacturers and suppliers:

 MIPRO and Elektronika from Buje, together with Institut za elektroniku i vakuumsku tehniku (en. Institute for electronics and vacuum technology) delivered PCBs, keyboards and masks
 Mikrotehnika from Graz sent integrated circuits
 Voja Antonić personally programmed all EPROMs
 Galaksija collected requisition forms and organized deliveries

Later, Institute for school books and teaching aids together with Elektronika Inženjering started mass commercial production of Galaksija computers, mainly to be delivered to schools.

Technical specifications 
 CPU: Zilog Z80A 3.072 MHz
 ROM "A" or "1" – 4 KB (2732 EPROM) contains bootstrap, core control and Galaksija BASIC interpreter code
 ROM "B" or "2" – 4 KB (optional, also 2732 EPROM) – additional Galaksija BASIC commands, assembler, machine code monitor, etc.
 Character ROM – 2 KB (2716 EPROM) contains character definitions, characters are 8 x 13 pixels, the block graphics were vertically divided in a 4:5:4 scheme, and horizontally in a 4:4 scheme.
 RAM: 2 to 6 KB of 6116 static RAM in base model, expandable to 54 KB
 Text mode 32 x 16 characters, monochrome
 Pseudographics: 2x3 dot matrix combinations in graphic character subset – 64x48 dots total.
 Sound: None according to specifications, but tape interface was occasionally used as audio output port – like the "EAR" port on ZX Spectrum can be used both as audio and cassette tape interface. See cassette port for details.
 Storage media: cassette tape, recording at 280 bit/s rate
 I/O ports: 44-pin edge connector with Z80 Bus, tape (DIN connector), monochrome video out (PAL timings, DIN connector), and UHF TV out (RCA connector)

BASIC ROMs 
Galaksija BASIC is a BASIC interpreter originally partly based on code taken from TRS-80 Level 1 BASIC, which the creator believed to have been a Microsoft BASIC. However, after extensive modifications to include video generation code (as the CPU was a major participant to reduce the cost of hardware) and improve the programming language, what remained from the original is said to be mainly flow-control and floating point code. It was fully contained in 4 KB ROM "A" or "1". Additional ROM "B" or "2" provided more Galaksija BASIC commands, assembler, monitor, etc.

ROM "A" 
The chip labeled as "A" by the creator of Galaksija, Voja Antonić was commonly referred to as "ROM 1" or just "ROM". ROM "A" contained bootstrap code of Galaksija, its control code (rudimentary operating system), video generation code (as Galaksija did not have advanced video subsystem its Z80 CPU was responsible even for generating video signal) and Galaksija BASIC.

Fitting all this functionality in 4 KB of 2732 EPROM required a lot of effort and some sacrifices. For example, some message text areas were also used actual code (e.g. "READY" message) and the number of error messages was reduced to only three ("WHAT?", "HOW?" and "SORRY").

ROM "B" 
ROM "B" of the Galaksija is a 2732 EPROM chip that contains extensions to the original Galaksija BASIC available in base ROM ("A"). It was labeled as "B" by the creator of the Galaksija, Voja Antonić, but was commonly referred to as "ROM 2".

ROM "B" contained added Galaksija BASIC commands and functions (mostly trigonometric) as well as a Z80 assembler and a machine code monitor. This ROM was not required and was an optional upgrade. Although planned on the mainboard, the content of ROM "B" was not automatically initialized during booting. Instead, users had to execute a Galaksija BASIC command to run a machine code program from ROM "B" before they can gain additional features. This also meant that even Galaksijas with ROM "B" plugged in can behave entirely as base models.

Character ROM 
Character ROM of home computer Galaksija is a 2716 EPROM chip that contains graphical definitions of Galaksija's character set. It had no special name and was labeled "2716" after the type of 2 KB EPROM needed.

Galaksija had a slightly modified (localized) ASCII character set:

 There were no lowercase characters
 Codes 91 to 94 represented the Serbian characters Č, Ć, Ž and Š, respectively. The letter "Đ" was not present in original version and was commonly replaced with "DJ".
 It contained 64 pseudo-graphics characters, having different combinations of dots in 2x3 matrix.
 Character codes 64 and 39 are used for two-halves of the logo of Elektronika Inženjering company (they can be seen in "READY" prompt)

Each character was represented as 8x13 matrix of pixels. In this ROM, 8-pixel rows of each character are represented as 8 bits of one byte.

"Cassette" port 
Galaksija used cassette tape as secondary storage. It featured a 5-pin DIN connector used to connect the computer to a cassette tape recorder. Tape interface circuitry was rudimentary – other than few elements controlling the levels it was essentially one-bit digital equivalent to the one in the ZX Spectrum. The input signal was routed to the integrated circuit otherwise responsible for keyboard, so the CPU would "see" the input signal as a series of very fast key presses of varying lengths and gaps between them.

It is normally stated that original Galaksija does not have any dedicated (separate) audio ports and most of the programs were written as silent. It was, however, possible to utilize the cassette tape port as an audio output as well like it is done in ZX Spectrum (its "EAR" connector). The only technical difference between ZX Spectrum and Galaksija in regards to existence of audio is that ZX Spectrum has a built-in beeper, while Galaksija's plans do not include any kind of a speaker.

Software sharing via radio 
In Autumn 1983, Računari’s editor contacted Zoran Modli, the DJ of Radio Belgrade 202's Ventilator 202 program, asking him to broadcast software as part of the show. As the Galaksija stored software on data cassette, Modli was able to alert listeners about an upcoming data broadcast, broadcast the data as sound over the regular FM wave  and listeners were able to record the data broadcast using home cassette decks and load the software on the Galaksija via the data cassette drive. Ventilator 202 became a hub of software sharing, with home programmers editing previously broadcast software and sending in the edits for future rebroadcast. Over three years Ventilator 202 broadcast 150 pieces of software for the Galaksija, the Spectrum and Commodore 64, including a digital magazine, named Hack News. Modli notes that while much of the software was written for the Ventilator 202 audience by Yugoslavian authors, plenty of those same authors were also cracking, pirating and sharing commercial software via the show.

Design 
To simplify "do-it-yourself" building and reduce cost, the printed circuit board was designed as single-layer (one-side) board. This resulted in a relatively complicated design requiring many components-side connections to be made using wires.

Galaksija's case was not pre-built. Instead, the guide suggested it to be built out of the printed circuit board material (such as Pertinax) also used for the mainboard. Thus, the top, sides and reinforcements were soldered together to form the "lid". Acrylic glass was recommended for the underside. The guide included instructions on cleaning, painting and even decorating the assembled case. The name "GALAKSIJA" and decorative border were to be added using Letraset transfer letter sheets after the first (white) coat of paint but before the second coat of final colour. After the paint dried, transferred decorations were supposed to be scratched off, exposing underlying white paint.

The keyboard is laid out such that keys have their own memory-mapped addresses that, in most cases, follow the same order as ASCII code of the letter on the key. This saved the ROM space by reducing lookup tables but significantly increased the complexity of single-layer keyboard PCB such that it alone required 35 jumpers.

Gallery

See also 
 History of computer hardware in Yugoslavia
 Galaksija BASIC – details about Galaksija's BASIC programming language
 Galaksija Plus – improved version of Galaksija, announced in Jun/July 1984 (6th) issue of "Računari" magazine (in English: Computers, renamed from "Računari u vašoj kući")
 Voja Antonić – the creator of Galaksija
 Dejan Ristanović – well known Serbian writer and computer publicist who authored much of the special issue magazine featuring Galaksija
 Z80 – Galaksija's CPU
ZX80 - Sinclair ZX80 which predates the Galaksija by 4 years and has a remarkably similar system design including using the Z80A to drive the video output.

References

External links

Articles 
 Computers in your home – short overview by Dejan Ristanović, the author of Računari u vašoj kući magazine issue, in English
 1983: Galaksija – how it all started, by Galaksija's creator Voja Antonić himself (in Serbian)
 Computer Galaksija – detailed description of computer operation for those planning to build it, as published in the Računari u vašoj kući magazine issue. Written by creator Voja Antonić, in Serbian.
 Uputstvo za upotrebu – complete, original, user manual on-line, in Serbian.
 Magazine Scans – scans of original magazine pages containing schematic diagrams, building and other instructions and programs for Galaksija (text in Serbian)
 Računar Galaksija by Dejan Ristanović, the author of Računari u vašoj kući magazine issue, in Serbian
 Crowd Supply Project - Crowd Supply Project may offer another Galaksija

Presentations 
 The Ultimate Galaksija Talk - in-depth presentation by Tomaž Šolc given at the 29C3 conference

Remakes 
 μGalaksija – FPGA Galaksija
 CMOS – CMOS Galaksija

Emulators 
 Galaksija Emulator – original DOS-based emulator by Miodrag Jevremović (in Serbian)
 Galaksija Emulator pages – Microsoft Windows port of original DOS emulator (in Serbian)
 MESS – The open source multi-platform multi-system emulator MESS supports Galaksija
 Sam Coupé — A Galaksija emulator running under Sam Coupé
 GALe - Galaksija Emulator - Emulates Galaksija in web browser.

Online museums 
 Old-Computers.com Museum page on Galaksija
 Zgodovina – an article in Slovene

Other 
 Zoran Modli Home page home page of Ventilator 202 radio show host (in Serbian). Same site contains a story of Ventilator 202 show, (also in Serbian).
 #247 – An Interview with Voja Antonic – Gerontogenous Galaksija Genesis An audio podcast interview with Voja Antonic about the creation of the Galaksija, in English.
 galaksija info in English with reproduced schematics, and an english translation of the thesis document "about the CMOS implementation of the GALAKSIJA retro home build computer" 

 
Home computers
Serbian inventions
Z80-based home computers